Zaldibia is a town and municipality in the Goierri region of the province of Gipuzkoa, in the Basque Country.

References

External links
 Official Website 
 ZALDIBIA in the Bernardo Estornés Lasa - Auñamendi Encyclopedia (Euskomedia Fundazioa) 

Municipalities in Gipuzkoa